"Only for You" is a song recorded by Sarah Engels from her first studio album  Heartbeat. It was written and produced by DSDS jury member Dieter Bohlen. The song was released on 2 September 2011.

Music video
A music video to accompany the release of "Only for You" was first released onto YouTube on 30 August 2011 at a total length of three minutes and sixteen seconds.

Track listing 
Digital download
 "Only for You" (Single version) - 3:16
 "We've Got Tonight" - 3:38

Chart performance

Release history

External links 
 Sarah Engels Official Website

References 

2011 singles
Sarah Lombardi songs
Songs written by Dieter Bohlen
2011 songs